

The Altec MART (for Mini-Avion de Reconnaissance Télépiloté - "Remotely piloted reconnaissance mini-aeroplane") is a reconnaissance UAV developed in France during the 1980s.

The Mark II version served with French forces in the first Gulf War. It has a simple conventional configuration like that of a large RC model. It is catapult-launched, carries an imaging system, and appears to be recovered by parachute.

Altec Industries is now selling an improved version of the MART II, the S-MART. It is slightly heavier, has seven hours endurance, and can carry ELINT and jamming payloads.

Specifications (MART Mk II)

References
 Jane's Unmanned Aerial Vehicles and Targets

This article contains material that originally came from the web article Unmanned Aerial Vehicles by Greg Goebel, which exists in the Public Domain.

1980s French military reconnaissance aircraft
Unmanned military aircraft of France
MART